Manfred Wolf (born 11 January 1948 in Steinbach-Hallenberg) is an East German former ski jumper who competed from 1971 to 1973.

Career
On 23 March 1969, he set the ski jumping world record at 165 metres (541 ft) at the opening of Velikanka bratov Gorišek K153 in Planica, Yugoslavia. It lasted for five years.

He finished fifth in the individual large hill event at the 1972 Winter Olympics in Sapporo. Wolf's best career finish was fourth in a normal hill event in West Germany in 1973.

Ski jumping world record

References

External links 

Ski jumpers at the 1972 Winter Olympics
German male ski jumpers
Olympic ski jumpers of East Germany
Living people
1948 births
People from Schmalkalden-Meiningen
Sportspeople from Thuringia